Kolobarića Dolac is a small village in Kočerin, Široki Brijeg municipality, Bosnia and Herzegovina. The village is famous for its large veteran's homes, for veterans of the Croatian War of Independence.

Some trenches in Croatian War of Independence are
 Tulac
 Gnjilavac
 Privija
 Garišta
 Kruška
 Vučja Rupa

The village once had a population of more than 800, however today it is less than 200.

Place is also famous by production of tobacco.

References 

Populated places in Široki Brijeg
Villages in the Federation of Bosnia and Herzegovina